The Mount Ida Cities Service Filling Station is a historic automotive service station at 204 Whittington Street in Mount Ida, Arkansas.  It is a small five-sided frame structure, finished in brick covered with stucco, with a hip roof that extends to form a canopy over the service area, with supporting brick piers at the far corners.  Its front (under the canopy) has fixed four-pane windows flanking a center entrance.  Built in 1925 by Cities Service, it was used as a gas station until 1966, and has since housed a variety of small businesses. Its role as a gas station was briefly resurrected in the film White River Kid, which was shot here in 1998.

The building was listed on the National Register of Historic Places in 2001.

See also
National Register of Historic Places listings in Montgomery County, Arkansas

References

Gas stations on the National Register of Historic Places in Arkansas
Commercial buildings completed in 1925
National Register of Historic Places in Montgomery County, Arkansas
Citgo
1925 establishments in Arkansas
Transportation in Montgomery County, Arkansas
Bungalow architecture in Arkansas
American Craftsman architecture in Arkansas